Michael Duut (born 22 January 1990) is a light heavyweight kickboxer from the Netherlands. He is known for his aggressive fighting style.  He is the 2017 Glory Light Heavyweight Contender Tournament Winner,fight of the year 2016 winner.

He is ranked a top ten Light Heavyweight. He once again entered the rankings in April 2013, He made brief appearances in the top ten between 2013 until 2021 and November.

Early life
Duut started kickboxing when he was 10 years old after being bullied at school. After a fight at school with an older boy his father made him to go back and fight again. According to him and his father he knocked the guy unconscious. His father sent him to kickboxing classes after that.

Duut is fighting out of Mejiro Gym since his early teens.

Kickboxing career
On 23 March 2013 Duut fought Dustin Jacoby at Glory 5: London, winning by TKO in the first round. 
On 20 April 2013 he defeated Australian Steve McKinnon by unanimous decision at Glory 7: Milan.

Duut was part of the Light Heavyweight Tournament Glory 9: New York - 2013 95kg Slam on 22 June 2013, losing in the first match to Tyrone Spong. Duut created an upset by dropping tournament favourite Spong in the first found, but was KO'd seconds later.

On 12 October 2013 he fought at Glory 11: Chicago where he lost in round 1 by TKO due to arm injury to Glory contender Danyo Ilunga.

Duut lost his third fight in a row on 8 March 2014 at Glory 14: Zagreb by KO in round 1 to Igor Jurković.

He broke the losing streak during the North vs. the Rest event, when he won a unanimous decision over Andre Schmeling. He won his next fight as well, as his opponent Nikolaj Falin suffered an injury in the first round.

Duut's next fight was against Danyo Ilunga during Glory 36. The fight, hailed as the "Fight of the Year" by Croring.com, went into as extra round, where Duut won a decision. Combat Press voted the bout their "2016 Comeback of the Year".

Riding a three fight winning streak, Duut fought Fred Sikking at WFL - Champion vs Champion. Sikking won the fight by a first round KO.

Despite losing his next fight to Mourad Bouzidi as well, he was granted a berth in the Glory Light Heavyweight Contender tournament. Duut scored KO wins over Dragoș Zubco in the semifinal and Manny Mancha in the final to win the tournament.

He is scheduled to fight Stéphane Susperregui during Glory 76: Antwerp.

Championships and accomplishments
 2016 Combat Press "Comeback of the Year" 
 2017 Glory Light Heavyweight Contender Tournament Winner

Kickboxing record

|-  style="background:#cfc;"
| 2021-10-23 || Win ||align=left| John King|| Glory: Collision 3 || Arnhem, Netherlands || KO (Knee) || 2 || 1:07
|-
|-  bgcolor="#FFBBBB"
| 2019-12-21|| Loss||align=left| Ariel Machado || Glory Collision 2 || Arnhem, Netherlands || Decision (Unanimous) || 3 || 3:00
|- style="background:#fbb;"
| 2019-10-12 || Loss||align=left| Luis Tavares || Glory 69: Düsseldorf || Düsseldorf, Germany || Decision (Unanimous) || 3 || 3:00
|-  style="background:#fbb;"
| 2019-04-09 || Loss||align=left| Donegi Abena || Glory 64: Strasbourg  || Strasbourg, France || Decision (Split) || 3 || 3:00
|-  style="background:#cfc;"
| 2018-09-29 || Win ||align=left| Mourad Bouzidi || Glory 59: Amsterdam  || Amsterdam, Netherlands || KO (Punch) || 3 ||  2:56
|-
|-  style="background:#fbb;"
| 2018-05-12 || Loss ||align=left| Zinedine Hameur-Lain || Glory 53: Lille  || Lille, France || TKO (Right Hook) || 2 ||  1:14
|-
|-  style="background:#fbb;"
| 2017-12-09 || Loss ||align=left| Danyo Ilunga  || Glory 49: Rotterdam || Rotterdam, Netherlands || KO (Punch) || 3 || 2:26
|- 
|-  style="background:#cfc;"
| 2017-09-30 || Win ||align=left| Manny Mancha || Glory 45: Amsterdam, Final || Amsterdam, Netherlands || KO (Punch) || 1 || 0:12
|-
! style=background:white colspan=9 |
|-
|-  style="background:#cfc;"
| 2017-09-30 || Win ||align=left| Dragoș Zubco || Glory 45: Amsterdam, Semi Finals || Amsterdam, Netherlands || KO (Punch) || 1 || 0:36
|-
|-  style="background:#fbb;"
| 2017-05-20 || Loss ||align=left| Mourad Bouzidi  || Glory 41: Holland || Den Bosch, Netherlands || DQ (3 point deductions) || 2 || 2:18
|-
|-  style="background:#fbb;"
| 2017-04-23 || Loss ||align=left| Fred Sikking || WFL - Champion vs. Champion || Almere, Netherlands || KO || 1 || 
|-
|- style="background:#cfc;" 
| 2016-12-10 || Win ||align=left| Danyo Ilunga || Glory 36: Oberhausen || Oberhausen, Germany || Ext. R. Decision (Unanimous) || 4 || 3:00
|- 
|-  style="background:#cfc;"
| 2016-11-20 || Win ||align=left| Nikolaj Falin || Enfusion Live 43 || Groningen, Netherlands || TKO (Injury) || 1 || 
|-
|-  style="background:#cfc;"
| 2015-03-28 || Win ||align=left| Andre Schmeling || North vs. the Rest || Leek, Netherlands || Decision (Unanimous) ||3  || 3:00
|-
|-  style="background:#fbb;"
| 2014-03-08 || Loss ||align=left| Igor Jurković || Glory 14: Zagreb ||Zagreb, Croatia || KO || 1 || 1:14
|- 
|-  style="background:#fbb;"
| 2013-10-12 || Loss ||align=left| Danyo Ilunga || Glory 11: Chicago || Hoffman Estates, Illinois, USA || TKO (arm injury) || 1 || 2:23
|- 
|-  style="background:#fbb;"
| 2013-06-22 || Loss ||align=left| Tyrone Spong || Glory 9: New York - 95 kg Slam Tournament, Quarter Finals || New York City, New York, USA || KO (right hook) || 1 || 0:31
|-
|-  style="background:#cfc;"
| 2013-04-20 ||Win || align=left|  Steve McKinnon || Glory 7: Milan || Milan, Italy ||Decision (Unanimous) ||3 ||3:00 
|-
|-  style="background:#cfc;"
| 2013-03-23 || Win ||align=left| Dustin Jacoby || Glory 5: London || London, England || TKO (referee stoppage) || 1 || 2:25
|-
|-  style="background:#cfc;"
| 2012-11-24 || Win ||align=left| Ricardo van den Bos || 2 the MAXX || Hoogeveen, Netherlands || KO || 3 ||
|- 
|-  style="background:#fbb;"
| 2012-05-12 ||Loss ||align=left| Rustemi Kreshnik || Siam Gym Belgium presents: It's Showtime 56 || Kortrijk, Belgium || TKO (referee stoppage) || 1 || 3:00
|-
|-  style="background:#cfc;"
| 2012-03-10 || Win ||align=left| Stefan Jelić || Cro Cop Final Fight || Zagreb, Croatia || Decision (Unanimous) || 3 || 3:00
|- 
|-  style="background:#fbb;"
| 2012-01-28 || Loss ||align=left| Anderson Silva || It's Showtime 2012 in Leeuwarden || Leeuwarden, Netherlands || Decision (Unanimous) || 3 || 3:00
|-
|-  style="background:#cfc;"
| 2011-10-30 || Win ||align=left| Jairzinho Rozenstruik || Kickboksgala Kalverdijkje || Leeuwarden, Netherlands || Decision ||3 || 3:00
|-
|-  style="background:#cfc;"
| 2010-12-12 || Win ||align=left| Koos Wessels  || 2 the MAXX || Hoogeveen, Netherlands || TKO (corner stoppage)||3 || 
|-
|-  style="background:#fbb;"
| 2010-10-09 || Loss ||align=left| Rico Verhoeven || Ring Rage V || Assen, Netherlands || Decision || 3 || 3:00
|-
|-  style="background:#cfc;"
| 2010-05-22 || Win ||align=left| Hakim Abdy  || 2 the MAXX || Assen, Netherlands || KO ||1 || 
|-
|-  style="background:#cfc;"
| 2010-03-28 || Win ||align=left| Waldemar Newdach  || Ring Rage IV || Groningen, Netherlands || KO ||1 || 
|-
|-  style="background:#cfc;"
| 2009-10-04 || Win ||align=left| Frank Muñoz || Ring Rage III || Groningen, Netherlands || Decision ||3 || 3:00
|- 
|-  style="background:#fbb;"
| 2008-08-30 || Loss ||align=left| Henriques Zowa ||  North Against South part 3 || Leek, Netherlands || TKO || 2 || 
|-
|-
| colspan=9 | Legend:

See also
List of male kickboxers

References

External links
Michael Duut Profile GloryWorldSeries.com

1990 births
Living people
Dutch male kickboxers
Heavyweight kickboxers
Glory kickboxers
Sportspeople from Groningen (city)